Microsoft Internet Explorer 4 (IE4) is the fourth, and by now, discontinued, version of the Internet Explorer graphical web browser that Microsoft unveiled in Spring of 1997, and released in September 1997, primarily for Microsoft Windows, but also with versions available for the classic Mac OS, Solaris, and HP-UX and marketed as "The Web the Way You Want It".

It was one of the main participants of the first browser war. Its distribution methods and Windows integration were involved in the United States v. Microsoft Corp. case. It was superseded by Microsoft Internet Explorer 5 in March 1999. It was the default browser in Windows 95 OSR 2.5 and Windows 98 First Edition (later default was Internet Explorer 5), and can replace previous versions of Internet Explorer on Windows 3.1x, Windows NT 3.51, Windows 95 and Windows NT 4.0; in addition the Internet Explorer layout engine MSHTML (Trident) was introduced. It attained just over 60% market share by March 1999 when IE5 was released. In August 2001 when Internet Explorer 6 was released, IE4.x had dropped to 7% market share and IE5 had increased to 80%. IE4 market share dropped under 1% by 2004.

Internet Explorer 4 is no longer available for download from Microsoft. However, archived versions of the software can be found on various websites.

Overview
The Internet Explorer 4.0 Platform Preview was released in April 1997, and Platform Preview 2.0 in July that year. Internet Explorer 4 was released to the public in September, 1997 and deepened the level of integration between the web browser and the underlying operating system. Installing version 4 on a Windows 95 or Windows NT 4 machine and choosing "Windows Desktop Update" would result in the traditional Windows Explorer being replaced by a version more akin to a web browser interface, as well as the Windows desktop itself being web-enabled via Active Desktop. The integration with Windows, however, was subject to numerous packaging criticisms (see United States v. Microsoft Corp.). This option was no longer available with the installers for later versions of Internet Explorer but was not removed from the system if already installed. Internet Explorer 4 introduced support for Group Policy, allowing companies to configure and lock down many aspects of the browser's configuration.  Internet Mail and News was replaced with Outlook Express, and Microsoft Chat and an improved NetMeeting were also included. This version also was included with Windows 98. Version 4.5 (only for Mac) dropped support for 68k Macs, but offered new features such as easier 128-bit encryption. The last non-Mac version was 4.0 Service Pack 2. Uninstalling IE4 became the subject of concern to some users and was a point of contention in later lawsuits (see Removal of Internet Explorer and United States v. Microsoft Corp..)

Internet Explorer version 4.0 for Macintosh

On January 6, 1998, at the Macworld Expo in San Francisco, Microsoft announced the release of the final version of Internet Explorer version 4.0 for Macintosh. Version 4 includes support for offline browsing, Dynamic HTML, a new faster Java virtual machine and Security Zones that allow users or administrators to limit access to certain types of web content depending on which zone (for example Intranet or Internet) the content is coming from. At the same event, Apple announced the release of Mac OS 8.1, which would be bundled with IE4.

At the following year's San Francisco Macworld Expo on January 9, 1999, Microsoft announced the release of Internet Explorer 4.5 Macintosh Edition. This new version dropped 68K processor support, introduced Form AutoFill, Print Preview, and Page Holder pane, which allowed user to hold a page of links on one side of the screen that opens pages in the right hand and support for Mac OS technology like Sherlock.

Internet Explorer 4 for Unix

On November 5, 1997, a beta of IE for Unix 4.0 was released for testing on Solaris. On January 27, 1998, it was reported that IE 4.0 for Solaris was due in March; Tod Nielsen, general manager of Microsoft's developer relations group, joked that "he wanted to launch Internet Explorer 4.0 for Unix at the Ripley's Believe It or Not! museum in San Francisco" because of skepticism from those who suspected IE for Unix was vaporware. It was further reported that versions for "HP-UX, IBM AIX, and Irix" were planned. The software used to enable this, MainWin XDE, was available for Solaris 2.5.1 on SPARC and Intel, SunOS 4.1.4, Irix 5.3, Irix 6.2, HP UX 10.2, and IBM AIX 4.1.5. On March 4, 1998, IE 4.0 for Unix on Solaris was released. Later that year, a version for HP-UX was released.

Features, technology, and integrated software
IE4 came with Active Desktop, Windows Desktop Update, Channels, Frontpage Express, Netmeeting, NetShow, Web Publishing Wizard, Microsoft Chat 2.0 and Progressive Networks RealPlayer. Outlook Express 4 replaced Internet Mail and News.

Other new features including Dynamic HTML, inline PNG, Favicons, a parental rating system, and the ability to 'subscribe' to a website in favorites, where it would notify the user of an update. Stephen Reid of PC Pro noted in his review:

Bundled and/or integrated software
 Microsoft Chat 2.0 is a simple text chatting program included in the Windows NT-line of operating system, including Windows NT 3.51, Windows XP and Windows Server 2003. It utilizes NetBIOS session service and NetDDE.
 Outlook Express 4.0 is the successor of Microsoft Internet Mail and News, an early e-mail client add-on for Internet Explorer 3. Internet Mail and News handled only plain text and rich text (RTF) e-mail, it lacked HTML email. Despite being versioned 4.0, Outlook Express was at its first iteration.
 NetMeeting is a VoIP and multi-point videoconferencing client that uses the H.323 protocol for video and audio conferencing.
 FrontPage Express 2.0 was a stripped-down version of Microsoft FrontPage. It was bundled with Internet Explorer 4, but was also available for free, and could be downloaded from online repositories.
 RealPlayer was a streaming media player made by Progressive Networks (later called RealNetworks). The first version of RealPlayer was introduced in April 1995 as RealAudio Player and was one of the first media players capable of streaming media over the Internet.

Active Desktop

Active Desktop is a feature of Microsoft Internet Explorer 4.0's optional Windows Desktop Update that allows the user to add HTML content to the desktop, along with some other features. This functionality was intended to be installed on the then-current Windows 95 operating system, and later Windows 98. Active Desktop placed a number of "channels" on the user's computer desktop that provided continually-updated information, such as news headlines and stock quotes, without requiring the user to open a web browser.

Channels

Active Channel is a website type which allows synchronizing website content and viewing it offline. It makes use of the Channel Definition Format, which is a way of defining a website's content and structure. Each country had different channels, so picking a country during the installation of IE 4 (and therefore Windows 98) was important. Channels could be displayed in a Channel Bar and made heavy use of Dynamic HTML.

Windows Desktop Update

Windows Desktop Update was an optional feature included with Internet Explorer 4, which provided several updated shell features later introduced with the Windows 98 operating system for older versions of Microsoft Windows. The Windows Desktop Update also added the ability to create desk-bands like the quicklaunch bar. It also updated the Windows file manager, explorer.exe (also a shell), to be more modular and extensible.

MSHTML

MSHTML (Trident) was a layout engine introduced with IE4. It was designed as a software component to allow software developers to easily add web browsing functionality to their own applications. It presents a COM interface for accessing and editing web pages in any COM-supported environment, like C++ and .NET. For instance, the WebBrowser control can be added to a C++ program and MSHTML can then be used to access the page currently displayed in the web browser and retrieve element values. Events from the WebBrowser control can also be captured. MSHTML functionality becomes available by connecting the file  to the software project.

Browser Helper Object

A Browser Helper Object (BHO) is a DLL module designed as a plugin for Internet Explorer 4.0, and provides added functionality. Most BHOs are loaded once by each new instance of Internet Explorer.

System requirements

Adoption capability overview
Internet Explorer 4.0 had support for Windows 3.1x, Windows 95, Windows 98, Windows NT 3.51, and Windows NT 4.0 (Service Pack 3 or later). Version 4.0 was included in the first release of Windows 98, although the second edition included IE5. HP-UX, Solaris, and Mac OS were also supported. IE4 supported 68k Macs, although this was dropped in Internet Explorer 4.5.

Windows
For Windows, Initially Windows 95 or above, 16MB of RAM, 11MB of disk space (minimum for install).

Mac
System Requirements for initial release of 4.0 for Mac:
 Macintosh with 68030 or higher processor
 System 7.1 or higher
 8 MB of RAM with virtual memory on (12 MB recommended)
 12 MB of hard disk space for IE4 and 8.5 MB of hard disk space for Java VM.
 Open Transport 1.1.1 or higher or MacTCP 2.0.6 or, Config PPP or similar PPP connection software (Control Panel) with PPP (Extension).

IE 4.5 did not support 68k Macs.

Encryption
Internet Explorer 4 was the first version of the browser to support TLS 1.0. Internet Explorer 4 supported 40-bit and later 128-bit encryption through an add-on, using Server Gated Cryptography (SGC). A 256-bit encryption would not become available in IE for nearly 10 years until the Windows Vista version of Internet Explorer 7.

128-bit encryption was available or included for these versions:
 Microsoft Internet Explorer 4.5 for Macintosh
 Microsoft Internet Explorer 4.5 128-Bit Edition
 Microsoft Internet Explorer 4.01
 Microsoft Internet Explorer 4.0 for Unix
 Microsoft Internet Explorer 4.01 Service Pack 2
 Microsoft Internet Explorer 4.0 for Macintosh
 Microsoft Internet Explorer 4.0 128-Bit Edition

If it is not possible to upgrade to 128-bit, then 40-bit (SGC) is standard.

Versions

Versions overview
Mac OS:
 Version 4.0 – January 6, 1998
 Version 4.5 – January 5, 1999

Comparison of features across platforms

See also
 History of the Internet
 United States v. Microsoft Corp.
 Comparison of web browsers
 Timeline of web browsers

Further reading

References

External links
 Internet Explorer Architecture
 Internet Explorer Community — The official Microsoft Internet Explorer Community

1997 software
Gopher clients
Internet Explorer
Discontinued internet suites
Macintosh web browsers
POSIX web browsers
Windows 95
Windows 98
Windows components
Windows web browsers